Andreas Weimann (born 5 August 1991) is an Austrian professional footballer who plays as a forward or winger for  club Bristol City and the Austria national team. Weimann was signed by Aston Villa as a sixteen-year-old from Rapid Vienna and went on to make over 100 appearances in the Premier League before his transfer to Derby County. He joined Wolves on loan in January 2017 before joining Bristol City in July 2018.

Club career

Rapid Wien
Born in Vienna, Weimann began his career at hometown club FC Stadlau before joining Rapid Wien as a thirteen-year-old. He remained there for three years, before being signed by Premier League club Aston Villa, joining the club alongside fellow Austrian Dominik Hofbauer. He has since mentioned that he still supports Rapid.

Aston Villa

Early career
Weimann represented the club during the 2009 Peace Cup against Juventus, Atlante and Porto. The striker was an important figure in Aston Villa's Reserves, particularly in the 2009–10 season filling the void left by Nathan Delfouneso where he finished the season as the Reserve South League's top scorer with nine goals.

Following an impressive stint in the reserves, Weimann signed a contract extension which tied him to the club until June 2012.

On 8 May 2010, Weimann was named in the provisional squad for the final match of the season against Blackburn Rovers after impressing manager Martin O'Neill during the Reserve Play-off Final against Manchester United. However, he was not among the final 18 players selected.

On 16 May 2010, Weimann was part of the Aston Villa team that won the Hong Kong Soccer Sevens tournament. A particular highlight of his performances during the cup was a hat-trick against the Yau Yee League Select of Hong Kong.

On 27 July 2010, Weimann, scored two goals for Aston Villa in a pre-season friendly against Walsall. The following month, on 6 August, Weimann came off the bench to appear for the first team in a home friendly against Spanish side Valencia.

On 14 August 2010, Weimann made his full league debut for Aston Villa, replacing Ashley Young as a substitute in the 86th minute against West Ham United. Villa caretaker manager Kevin MacDonald named Weimann in his 20-man squad to travel to Austria to face former club Rapid Wien in the UEFA Europa League on 19 August 2010; He came on as a substitute for Marc Albrighton after 79 minutes, only to be injured three minutes later. He was out of action until January 2011, when he returned to full training.

Watford loans
On 19 January 2011, Weimann signed for Watford on a loan deal for the remainder of the 2010–11 season. He made his debut for Watford in the FA Cup defeat vs Brighton and Hove Albion. He then made his league debut against Crystal Palace at home on 1 February 2011, and scored in the game. Weimann continued to play for Aston Villa's reserve side during his loan spell at Watford, as he was only signed on a youth loan. This form of loan allows players to continue to represent their parent clubs, but for youth and reserve teams only. He played 19 times in total for Watford, scoring 4 goals.

Weimann returned to Aston Villa and made his first appearance of the 2011–12 season on 23 August 2011 in the second round of the League Cup in a home tie against Hereford United. He came on as a second-half substitute for Darren Bent as Villa progressed to the next stage of the competition, courtesy of a 2–0 win. Three days later on 26 August, he signed a new contract to keep him at Villa Park until 2014. But just hours after renewing his Aston Villa contract, Weimann returned to Watford in a second loan deal until January 2012. He made three Championship appearances for Watford against Birmingham City, Reading and Barnsley throughout August and September. However, just under a month later on 23 September, it was announced that Weimann had been recalled to his parent club early to cope with mounting injury concerns.

Return to Villa
Following his return to the club, Weimann went straight in to the squad for the away game at Queens Park Rangers.

After scoring two hat tricks in the reserves, fans were calling for Weimann to get some first team involvement with Darren Bent ruled out for the season with an injury picked up at Wigan.

On 10 March 2012, having come on as a substitute for Charles N'Zogbia, Weimann scored his first goal for Villa in the 92nd minute, giving the team a 1–0 victory over Fulham. The goal stemmed from Gary Gardner's shot when it was fumbled by the Fulham keeper and Weimann reacted fastest as he bundled in the winner and became an instant fans favourite. On 9 April he scored a goal against Stoke City in a 1–1 draw and was close to getting a second in the game.

On 10 November 2012, Weimann scored two goals against Manchester United at Villa Park, and both goals showed Weimann's predatory instinct and shooting prowess. The match eventually finished 3–2 to Manchester United but Weimann received a standing ovation from the Villa Park crowd when he was substituted. On 11 December 2012, Weimann scored two goals for Villa as they beat Norwich City 4–1, which saw them through to the semi-final of the League Cup. Four days later, he scored Villa's second goal away at Liverpool after a neat combination with Christian Benteke, signalling a good partnership and understanding developing between the two. He then scored against Swansea City on 1 January 2013, again being assisted by Benteke. Later that week, he scored an 83rd-minute winner in an FA Cup third round game against Ipswich Town to send Villa through to the fourth Round. After scoring in the first leg Weimann, who came on as a substitute, grabbed a goal against Bradford City in the semi-final second-leg. However the 89th-minute goal was too late for Villa, as they were eliminated after losing 4–3 on aggregate. Weimann ended the season with 12 goals in all competitions, averaging a one-goal to three appearance ratio.

Weimann opened his scoring for the 2013–14 season on 28 August 2013 with a  shot against Rotherham United in a 3–0 win in the League Cup. His second, a month later, was the decider in a 3–2 defeat of Manchester City. On 3 May 2014, Weimann scored two goals against Hull City in a game which ended in a 3–1 victory and secured Premier League survival.

Weimann started the first game of the 2014–15 season for Villa against Stoke City, in which he scored the only goal in the 50th minute to lead the team to victory. His second goal of the season came in a 2–1 defeat of Hull City on 31 August 2014, slotting home from ten yards out after receiving the ball from Kieran Richardson. Weimann scored his third of the season in a 2–1 defeat to Spurs at Villa Park, converting a low cross from Charles N'Zogbia from 15 yards out. This was Villa's first goal in 5 games. Weimann scored his next goal in an FA Cup 4th round tie against Bournemouth, scoring the second goal in a 2–1 victory at Villa Park

Derby County
On 18 June 2015, Weimann joined Derby County on a four-year deal. He scored his first goal for the Rams in the 7th minute in a 3–0 victory over Rotherham United on 31 October 2015. After having started only one league match during the 2016–17 season, Weimann joined Wolverhampton Wanderers on loan for the rest of the season on 19 January 2017.

He made his debut for the club on 21 January 2017, coming on as a substitute in a 3–1 defeat to Norwich. A week later, on 28 January 2017, he made his first start and scored his first goal for the club in a 2–1 FA Cup win against Liverpool at Anfield.

Bristol City
On 3 July 2018, Weimann signed for Championship club Bristol City on a three-year contract, with an option for a further year, for an undisclosed fee.
On 30 March 2019, Weimann scored his first career hat-trick as Bristol City beat Sheffield United 3–2 at Bramall Lane, taking his goal tally up to 9 in the process, his highest amount in any season. His hat-trick was the first a Bristol City player had scored away from home in the top two tiers of English football since Kevin Mabbutt in 1978.

Weimann scored 22 league goals in the 2021–22 season to reach a career-best goal tally for a season.

International career

Weimann has represented Austria at under-17, under-19 and under-21 levels. Weimann scored on his under-21 debut against Scotland Under-21 in a 2011 UEFA European Under-21 Championship qualification match on 5 September 2009. Weimann scored in the 57th minute, just 2 minutes after replacing team-mate Marc Sand as a substitute. Weimann's other two goals in the qualifying process came against Azerbaijan and Albania.

In July 2010, Weimann was called up to the Austria U-19 squad for the 2010 UEFA European Under-19 Championship. Weimann featured in all three of Austria's games and came up against his Aston Villa team-mate Nathan Delfouneso in a 3–2 loss against England.

On 12 October 2012, Weimann made his debut for the Austria senior team against Kazakhstan in a 0–0 draw.

In March 2022, Weimann was recalled to the Austria senior team for their 2022 FIFA World Cup play-off match against Wales, his first call-up in seven years.

On 10 June 2022, Weimann scored his first international goal against France, which gave Austria the lead in a UEFA Nations League game.

International goal
Scores and results list Austria's goal tally first.

Career statistics

Club

International

References

External links
Profile at the Bristol City F.C. website

1991 births
Living people
Footballers from Vienna
Austrian footballers
Austria youth international footballers
Austria under-21 international footballers
Austria international footballers
Association football forwards
SK Rapid Wien players
Aston Villa F.C. players
Watford F.C. players
Derby County F.C. players
Wolverhampton Wanderers F.C. players
Bristol City F.C. players
Premier League players
English Football League players
Austrian expatriate footballers
Expatriate footballers in England
Austrian expatriate sportspeople in England